George Clement Tryon, 1st Baron Tryon, PC (15 May 1871 – 24 November 1940) was a British Conservative politician who served in a number of ministerial positions in the inter-war years.

George Clement Tryon was son of Vice-Admiral Sir George Tryon and Clementina Heathcote, daughter of Gilbert Heathcote, 1st Baron Aveland. Educated at Eton College and the Royal Military College, Sandhurst, Tryon joined the Grenadier Guards in 1890, serving for sixteen years before retiring as major.

Tryon was elected as Member of Parliament (MP) for Brighton in 1910, serving until 1940. He became Under-Secretary of Air in 1919 and Parliamentary Secretary to the Ministry of Pensions in 1920 and in 1922 became a Privy Counsellor. He served as Minister of Pensions himself 1922–24, 1924–29 and 1931–35 and was then appointed Postmaster General in 1935, serving until 1940. He was one of those to appear on the first day of BBC television broadcasts, 2 November 1936.

In April 1940, Tryon was elevated to the peerage as Baron Tryon, of Durnford in the County of Wilts and made Chancellor of the Duchy of Lancaster and First Commissioner of Works. However, he was replaced as Chancellor (by Lord Hankey) when Winston Churchill became prime minister in May, while retaining the First Commissionership; he relinquished that post the following October, a few weeks before his death, aged 69.

He married Averil Vivian, daughter of Colonel Sir Henry Hussey Vivian, 1st Baron Swansea. They had two children, including Charles, 2nd Baron Tryon.

Arms

References

External links
 

1871 births
1940 deaths
Chancellors of the Duchy of Lancaster
Conservative Party (UK) MPs for English constituencies
Conservative Party (UK) hereditary peers
Graduates of the Royal Military College, Sandhurst
Grenadier Guards officers
Members of the Privy Council of the United Kingdom
Ministers in the Chamberlain peacetime government, 1937–1939
Ministers in the Chamberlain wartime government, 1939–1940
Ministers in the Churchill wartime government, 1940–1945
People educated at Eton College
George
UK MPs 1910
UK MPs 1910–1918
UK MPs 1918–1922
UK MPs 1922–1923
UK MPs 1923–1924
UK MPs 1924–1929
UK MPs 1929–1931
UK MPs 1931–1935
UK MPs 1935–1945
UK MPs who were granted peerages
United Kingdom Postmasters General
Barons created by George VI